Richard Edward "Slim" Vaughan (April 22, 1910 – July 3, 1992) was an American Negro league pitcher in the 1930s.

A native of Richmond, Virginia, Vaughan played for the Newark Dodgers in 1934. In nine recorded games on the mound, he posted a 7.49 ERA over 33.2 innings. Vaughan died in Plainfield, New Jersey in 1992 at age 82.

References

External links
 and Seamheads

1910 births
1992 deaths
Newark Dodgers players
Baseball pitchers
Baseball players from Richmond, Virginia
20th-century African-American sportspeople